Norfolk Island competed in the 2010 Commonwealth Games held in Delhi, India, from 3 to 14 October 2010.

Team Norfolk Island at the 2010 Commonwealth Games

Archery

Team Norfolk Island consists of 5 archers.

Rosa Ford, Bob Kemp, Michael Graham, Jonno Snell, Jo Snell

They competed in the
 Men's Compound Individual
 Men's Compound Team
 Women's Compound Individual

Lawn Bowls

Team Norfolk Island consists of 9 lawn bowls players.

Carmen Anderson, Kitha Bailey, John Christian, Petal Hore, Margaret O'Brien, Anne Pledger, Esther Sanchez, Timothy Sheridan, Barry Wilson

They competed in the
 Men's Triples
 Women's Singles
 Women's Pairs
 Women's Triples

Shooting

Team Norfolk Island consists of 4 shooters.

Graham Cock, Graham Lock, Denise Reeves, Stephen Ryan

They competed in the
 Men's Singles 10m Air Pistol
 Men's Pairs 10m Air Pistol
 Men's Singles 25m Standard Pistol
 Men's Pairs 25m Standard Pistol
 Men's Singles 25m Centrefire Pistol
 Men's Pairs 25m Centrefire Pistol
 Women's Singles 10m Air Pistol
 Women's Singles 25m Pisol

Squash

Team Norfolk Island consists of 4 squash players

Peter Christian-Bailey, Gye Duncan, Duncan Gray, Mal Rundell

They competed in the
 Men's Doubles

References

External links

Norfolk Island at the Commonwealth Games
Nations at the 2010 Commonwealth Games
2010 in Norfolk Island
2010 in Australian sport